François Charles Archile Jeanneret (November 18, 1890 – 1967) was the 22nd Chancellor of the University of Toronto, holding the position from 1959 to 1965.

Early life
Jeanneret was born in Elmira, Ontario, Canada on November 18, 1890. He graduated with honors from Berlin Collegiate and played on the school's soccer team, winning the Dominion Football Association championship. After high school, Jeanneret attended the University of Toronto, the University of Chicago, and finally the University of Paris in Paris, France.

Career
When he completed his academic studies, he took a position as the head of the department of modern languages at Upper Canada College from 1912 to 1913, and joined the staff of the University of Toronto's University College in 1913. From 1926 to 1941, he directed the Ontario Ministry of Education's oral French course for teachers at Quebec City and was honored by Laval University. He was named an Officer d'Academie in 1940 by France, and was later awarded a medal from the French government in 1959 and the Pierre Chauveau Medal from the Royal Society of Canada. When he returned to the University of Toronto, Jeanneret took on several positions, including chairman of the university's School of Graduate Studies from 1947 to 1951, principal of University College from 1951 to 1959, and Chancellor of the University of Toronto from 1959 until his death in 1967. While Chancellor, Jeanneret also held several diplomatic posts including Canadian delegate to the  Commonwealth Education Conference in Oxford, United Kingdom in 1959 and Delhi, India in 1962. Jeanneret authored fifteen textbooks during his lifetime, including French texts used in Ontario high schools, and received an honorary degree, receiving a Doctor of Letters, from the Memorial University of Newfoundland in May 1963.

References

External links 
 

 Francois Charles Archile Jeanneret archival papers held at the University of Toronto Archives and Records Management Services 

Chancellors of the University of Toronto
University of Toronto alumni
University of Chicago alumni
University of Paris alumni
1890 births
1967 deaths
People from the Regional Municipality of Waterloo
Franco-Ontarian people